SanviD (Sandeepani Vidyapeeth) is an English medium, co-educational school in Odisha, India.

History
SanviD was started in 2006 by Dr. Kushal Shah  with the aim of providing education to the children of Balasore and nearby areas. SanviD is run as a part of the Sandeepani Educational Society. The management of the school is primarily handled by Mr. Kishan Shah, who is one of the founder members of the society. Sandeepani Educational Society has the following members:

Academics
SanviD classes are Pre-nursery, Nursery, KG I, KG II, and Std. 1–12. Though admissions usually happen in the beginning of the academic year, bright students are encouraged to apply  throughout the year. Admissions are based on merit.

Activities
Some of the activities encouraged at SanviD are:
 Public Speaking
 Dancing
 Music
 Painting
 Dramatics
 Sports and games
There are special hours dedicated to train students in the above activities.

References

Schools in Odisha
Education in Balasore district
Educational institutions established in 2006
2006 establishments in Orissa